Joel Craig Stevens (born 7 February 1995) is a New Zealand footballer who plays as a striker for Swedish club Oskarshamns AIK.

Club career
In March 2018, Joel joined Husqvarna FF who play in Division 1 Södra in Sweden.

In November 2019, Stevens returned home to Dunedin to play again for his Youth club Southern United in the ISPS Handa Premiership

In March 2020, Stevens joined Swedish club IFK Värnamo in Division 1 Södra.

External links

References

1995 births
Living people
Association football forwards
New Zealand association footballers
New Zealand international footballers
New Zealand expatriate association footballers
Wellington Phoenix FC players
Waitakere United players
Team Wellington players
Husqvarna FF players
Southern United FC players
IFK Värnamo players
Oskarshamns AIK players
A-League Men players
Ettan Fotboll players
New Zealand Football Championship players
New Zealand expatriate sportspeople in Sweden
Expatriate footballers in Sweden